The tawny grassbird (Cincloramphus timoriensis) is a large songbird that is part of the grass- and bush-warbler family (Locustellidae) commonly found in grassland and reedbed habitats.  It is streaked above and has a distinctive rich brown cap. Its underside is paler and it has a long graduated tail. They call often with "loud, grumpy churring calls and a longer call that starts tick-tick-tick-tick and ends with an explosive descending trill".

The tawny grassbird has 10 identified sub-species found in Australia, Indonesia, Papua New Guinea and the Philippines.

Taxonomy 

The family Locustellidae was named by Bonaparte in 1854 and is derived from the genus name Locustella named by Kemp in 1829. The term "grassbird" was used by Gould during the mid 19th century to signify a strong correlation to long grass habitats. The tawny grassbird has also been known as tawny sphenoeacus, grassbird, tawny or rufous-capped marshbird, rufous-capped grass-warbler and rufous-capped grassbird. Grass-warbler tends to be used in Asia rather than Australia. Genetic studies indicate a close relationship to songlarks.

The tawny grassbird has 10 identified sub-species

 Cincloramphus timoriensis timoriensis (Timor, Lesser Sundas.)

 Cincloramphus timoriensis tweeddalei (n and c Philippines)
 Cincloramphus timoriensis alopex (Bohol, Leyte and Cebu, c Philippines.)
 Cincloramphus timoriensis amboinensis (Ambon, s Moluccas)
 Cincloramphus timoriensis crex (s Philippines)
 Cincloramphus timoriensis mindorensis (Mindoro, nw Philippines.)
 Cincloramphus timoriensis celebensis (Sulawesi)
 Cincloramphus timoriensis inquirendus (Sumba, Lesser Sundas.)
 Cincloramphus timoriensis muscalis (s New Guinea)
 Cincloramphus timoriensis alisteri (n and e Australia)

The sub-species  Cincloramphus timoriensis alisteri has been divided into Cincloramphus timoriensis alisteri (alisteri) located in Eastern Australia and Cincloramphus timoriensis alisteri (oweni) located in Northern Australia.

While the family name Locustellidae is generally accepted some authorities place the tawny grassbird in the Sylviidae family. Also the genus name Cincloramphus is normally used but megalurus is also commonly used.

Description 
The tawny grassbird is a medium sized grassbird with a wingspan of 56-69mm, a stout bill 14-17mmand weighs around 13-25g. The bird has an unstreaked rufous (rich brown) cap, obvious rufous fringes to flight feathers on the folded wing and wholly unstreaked underparts.It also has a long drooping tail and rufous rump. The male has a varied song given in both display flights and from exposed perches. The males sing mostly in spring and summer.

The tawny grassbird is distinguished from the related little grassbird by its larger size, stouter bill, more rufous plumage and longer tail.

Distribution and habitat 
Within Australia the tawny grassbird is mainly found on "coastal lowlands in rank grasslands, sedges reeds and rushes" and bordering wetlands In 2011 a population of tawny grassbirds was located in Alice Springs, almost a 100km from other populations. Generally, grassbirds found in inland Eastern Australia are little grassbirds.

Behaviour

Feeding 
Tawny grassbirds feed on insects.

Vocalisation 
The Slater Field Guide notes the voice is a rich ch-ch-ch-zzzzzzt lik lik: loud see-lick: high-pitched descending trill. In flight, it has "metallic chuck chuck chuck."  The Australian Bird Guide  describes displaying males with a "delightful varied song, given both in display flights and from exposed perches.  Its alarm call is a repeated "harsh tjik or jk-jk".

Reproduction 

Tawny grassbirds nest in long grass in well hidden cups of grass. They generally lay 3 freckled reddish eggs.

Status and conservation 
The species is rated Least Concern (LC) as it has an extensive range, the population appears to be stable and although the population size has not been quantified, it is not believed that it is approaching Vulnerable. Some concern has been expressed for a decline in populations because of persistent grazing of tall grasses but in New Guinea it was observed that population density was greater in shorter grazed grass than the neighbouring taller grasses.

References

External Links 
Birdlife International, Species factsheet.

tawny grassbird
Birds of Australia
Birds of the Philippines
Birds of Wallacea
Birds of New Guinea
tawny grassbird
Taxonomy articles created by Polbot